The 1976 John Player League was the eighth competing of what was generally known as the Sunday League.  The competition was won for the third time by Kent County Cricket Club.

Standings

Batting averages

Bowling averages

See also
Sunday League

References

John Player
Pro40